Eric Guggenheim (born October 22, 1973) is an American screenwriter. He graduated from NYU's Tisch School of the Arts in 1995. Two years later he sold a script, Trim, to Fox 2000 at age 23.  Following that, he wrote an unproduced drama for Warner Bros. and a one-hour drama pilot for USA Network. In 2004, Guggenheim wrote the feature film Miracle. Guggenheim is currently a writer, executive producer and co-showrunner of the CBS series Hawaii Five-0 and Magnum P.I., he was announced as the showrunner after co-creator Peter Lenkov was fired by CBS. Before that he spent four seasons as a writer on the NBC series Parenthood. His brothers are screenwriters Marc Guggenheim and David Guggenheim. His family is Jewish.

References

Kate McCallum, "The Great Idea: The Feature Film and the Making of Miracle". scr(i)pt. Vol. 10, No.1. Pg. 32.

External links

 https://web.archive.org/web/20110718134022/http://preview.tv.yahoo.com/eric-guggenheim/contributor/38965
Hollywood Reporter: "The Guggenheim Brothers Offer a Look Inside a TV Writing Family Dynasty" October 7, 2016

American male screenwriters
Tisch School of the Arts alumni
1973 births
Living people
Jewish American screenwriters
Showrunners